Green Zone Community Climate Action is an unincorporated charitable association formed in November 2016. Based in Broomfield, Essex, this organization delivers climate change awareness at a grassroots level to improve public understanding of global warming and promote individual actions that can help address it. The charity works with Marks & Spencer through the project  among other retailers to reduce food waste and share unsold food within the community. It also supports climate education for primary school children through clubs. The charity took part in the worldwide "24 Hours of Reality" campaign broadcast by The Climate Reality Project. Working alongside additional community charities, Green Zone Community Climate Action is one of many new projects created to assist the UK in meeting the United Nations Global Sustainable Development Goals.

History 
The UK government created a Department of Energy and Climate Change in 2008 to address the country's policies on this global issue. Following the appointment of Prime Minister Theresa May, the department was abolished. An Environmental Audit Select Committee, chaired by Mary Creagh Labor MP for Wake-field, reviews governments' policies and programmers within government departments and public bodies on their effort to address climate change.

Initiatives 

Feed-in tariffs in the United Kingdom are financial incentives that pay for the electricity generated and fed back into the National Grid to encourage the purchase of renewable energy through solar panels on residential and business properties. The tariff rates have gradually decreased, making it less desirable to purchase renewable energy.

The National Curriculum in the UK briefly covers climate change in Key Stages 3 and 4. Children in earlier years are taught about the topic of recycling when looking at different materials. Traditionally, information and education on climate change is saved for those who take an active interest in their later education and courses are available to adult learners.

References

External links 

 Green Zone Community Climate Action

Climate change organisations based in the United Kingdom
Environmental organisations based in England
Environmental organizations established in 2016